Accident is a 1984 Indian Kannada language film directed by Shankar Nag.

Plot
Deepak, the spoilt son of a powerful politician Dharmadhikari, runs his car over pavement dwellers one night under the influence of drugs. All are killed, except Ramanna, who identifies the driver. His friend Rahul, son of an advertising agency chief, is with him during the accident. The shock of the accident leaves Rahul deeply traumatised.

Unable to hold the secret any longer, Rahul shares the truth with his mother. She in turn implores Dharmadhikari to save them. Dharmadhikari who is slated to win a by-election cannot afford to let this accident ruin his political ambitions. He hushes up the case with the help of Chief Minister and sends his son on a trip abroad. Sub-Inspector Rao takes charge of the case as an investigative officer.

Ravi, a daring investigative journalist, joins Rao and they investigate the case together. When Rao identifies the culprits, Dharmadhikari asks his retired driver to say he was driving the car.

As a result of the events that have transpired, Rao is asked to go on leave and Ravi's editor refuses to run the story. On his way to the airport, Deepak dies in an accident.

Cast
 Anant Nag as Dharmadhikari, a politician
 Shankar Nag as Ravi, a journalist
 Arundhati Nag as Maya Rani
 Ashok Mandanna as Deepak
 Makeup Naani as Editor Shamanna
 Srinivas Prabhu as Rahul
 Ramesh Bhat as Inspector Rao
 T. S. Nagabharana as Ramanna
 H. G. Somashekar Rao as Mechanic Pinto
 Shimoga Venkatesh as Police Commissioner

Analysis

Contrary to stereotypes of Indian cinema which include romantic interests and musical sequences, Accident takes a neo-noir approach. This can be considered one of the earliest attempts towards a paradigm shift in film making in India which didn't take off until the early 2000s as a result of the death of Shankar Nag in 1990.

Notes
The film starred Shankar Nag's brother Anant Nag and his wife Arundhati Nag. The film was produced in two months. While filming the climax, Anant Nag who was playing the politician, was to be shot in the courtyard of his house. He had wanted to base it around the assassination of Indira Gandhi. Shankar Nag agreed that it had to be that way and therefore changed the ending of the film.

Reception
The film won the first National Film Award for Best Film on Other Social Issues at the 32nd National Film Awards in 1985. It also won multiple awards at the 1984–85 Karnataka State Film Awards including the award for First Best Film. The film was praised for placing a politician against justice system and media revealing the nexus between politics and drug mafia.

Awards and Recognitions 
32nd National Film Awards
 National Film Award for Best Film on Other Social Issues

1984–85 Karnataka State Film Awards
 First Best Film
 Best Supporting Actress – Arundathi Nag
 Best Screenplay – Vasantha Mokashi
 Best Sound Recording – Pandurangan
 Special Award (Stunts) – Hasan Raghu

14th International Film Festival of India
 Screening; homage to Shankar Nag

References

External links
 

1985 films
1980s Kannada-language films
Films scored by Ilaiyaraaja
Best Film on Other Social Issues National Film Award winners
Films directed by Shankar Nag